Mironov, or Mironova (feminine: Миронова) is a Russian last name and may refer to:

Mironov
Alexander Mironov, cyclist
Alexandru Mironov (b. 1942), science-fiction author, television personality and politician
Andrei Mironov (disambiguation), several people
Arseny Mironov (1917–2019), aerospace scientist, engineer, aircraft pilot
Boris Mironov (b. 1972), professional ice hockey defenseman
Dmitri Mironov (b. 1965), retired ice hockey defenseman
Filipp Mironov (1872–1921), military leader
Helen Mirren, actress (nee Ilyena Vasilievna Mironov)
Lev Mironov (1895–1938) NKVD Main Directorate of State Security Department of Economics
Maxim Mironov (b. 1981), opera singer, tenor
Pavel Vasilyevich Mironov (1900–1969), lieutenant general, Hero of the Soviet Union
Pavel Andreyevich Mironov (1919–1945), Hero of the Soviet Union
Sergey Mironov (b. 1953), politician
Sergey Mironov (1914–1964), aircraft pilot, Hero of the Soviet Union
Stepan Mironov (1883–1959), geologist and academician
Valentin Mironov (1923–1989), army officer, Hero of the Soviet Union
Vasili Mironov (1919–?), army officer, Hero of the Soviet Union
Viktor Mironov (1918–1943), aircraft pilot, Hero of the Soviet Union
Vladimir Mironov, multiple people
Vyacheslav Mironov (b. 1961), writer and army officer
Yevgeny Mironov (b. 1966), actor of stage and screen
Yevgeny Mironov (b. 1948), athlete

Mironova
 Maria Vladimirovna Mironova (1911–1997), actress, mother of the Andrei Mironov
 Maria Mironova (b. 1973), actress, daughter of the Andrei Mironov
 Yekaterina Mironova (b. 1977), skeleton racer
 Yelizaveta Mironova, Soviet sniper in World War II

References

Russian-language surnames